Bleecker Street is an independent American film company that specializes in film distribution. The company is based in New York City and named after 65 Bleecker Street, the street address of Andrew Karpen's prior company Focus Features. It was founded in 2014 by Andrew Karpen, with the goal to distribute “smart house” films that combine the entertainment of studio blockbusters with the artistic indie allure.

History
Bleecker Street was formed in August 2014 by CEO Andrew Karpen, who is the former co-CEO of Focus Features. It was launched with backing from Manoj Bhargava. With the announcement of the company's formation, Bleecker had indicated an exclusive U.S. distribution output deal with Shivani Rawat's ShivHans Pictures, effective immediately. Initial plans have the distributor releasing three to five pictures in 2015 and expanding from there. Karpen hired four former Focus Feature employees as presidents in September 2014. At the September 2014 Toronto International Film Festival, Bleecker Street made its first film deal for Pawn Sacrifice'''s North American rights.

Bleecker Street focused on primarily theatrical releases and quickly established itself as a player on the indie-film scene with their titles such as Steven Soderbergh's Logan Lucky and Eye in the Sky, the biggest arthouse release of 2016 starring Helen Mirren.

Partnerships
2015-2019

In January 2015 at Sundance Film Festival, Bleecker Street made its first acquisition of worldwide rights with the purchase of Brett Haley's I'll See You In My Dreams At the same time, the company signed a multi-year home entertainment distribution deal with Universal Pictures Home Entertainment, now distributed by Studio Distribution Services, LLC., a joint venture between UPHE and Warner Bros. Home Entertainment. Later in the month, the company signed a multi-year Canadian distribution deal with Elevation Pictures starting with Danny Collins. Bleecker Street followed that up with an exclusive multi-year licensing agreement with Amazon Prime.

In 2019, Bleecker Street partnered with Hulu on a new output deal granting Hulu exclusive SVOD rights to all upcoming Bleecker Street theatrical films. The first film to hit the streaming service in Fall 2019 was Hotel Mumbai.

2021-2022

In 2021, Bleecker Street partnered with Neon to launch the joint home entertainment distribution company DECAL. DECAL is a standalone full-service operation that handles distribution deals on the home entertainment rights to both NEON and Bleecker Street's curated slate of features. The first film to be distributed through DECAL in Winter 2021 was Bleecker Street's film Supernova.In February 2022 it was announced that Showtime Networks and Bleecker Street had struck an exclusive three-year output deal for the distributor's movies. It replaces Bleecker Street's previous output agreement with Hulu. Under the agreement, effective March, Showtime will carry Bleecker Street movies on air, on demand and via its streaming services within five months of their initial release. The agreement spans up to 12 films per year, all of which will be released theatrically by Bleecker Street.

Bleecker Street announced their first exclusive short Look at me to be launched on Bleecker Street's app in early 2023, joining a collection of shorts by filmmaking partners including Joe Penna (Arctic), Riley Stearns (The Art of Self-Defense), Gavin Hood (Eye in the Sky), and Alex Huston-Fischer (Save Yourselves!).

It was announced on September 9, 2022, that Bleecker Street has signed an exclusive output deal with Canadian distributor LevelFilm. LevelFilm will handle the Canadian distribution to Bleecker Street's films where they control the North American or worldwide rights. The first movie that will be released under the new joint venture is Catherine Hardwicke's action comedy Mafia Mamma, which stars Toni Collette and Monica Belucci and is set for a nationwide release in 2023.

On October 27, 2022, Bleecker Street announced that they are teaming up with Showtime to release a feature-length documentary 2nd Chance'' from Oscar nominated filmmaker Ramin Bahrani. Bahrani's debut is an exploration of the life and legacy of Richard Davis, the inventor of the modern-day bulletproof vest who shot himself 192 times to prove his product worked. The film will open in New York and Los Angeles on Friday, December 2, expanding to additional cities December 9. Showtime will then premiere the film on air, on streaming and on demand for all Showtime subscribers next Spring.

Distribution library

References

External links
 

2014 establishments in New York City
American companies established in 2014
Entertainment companies based in New York City
Film distributors of the United States
Mass media companies established in 2014
Privately held companies based in New York City